James Davies Lightbody (March 16, 1882 – March 2, 1953) was an American middle distance runner, winner of six Olympic medals (two of which are no longer recognized by the International Olympic Committee following its downgrading of the 1906 Intercalated Games) in the early 20th century.

Lightbody, born in Pittsburgh and graduating from high school in Muncie, Indiana, had great success at the 1904 Summer Olympics, held in St. Louis. He wasn't favoured in any of the three individual events in which he competed, but nevertheless won all three of them.

First, he won the 2590 metre steeplechase, sprinting to the 800 metres title days later. Finally, he won the 1500 metres in a new world record. Later that day, he added a second place to his tally, when he competed with the Chicago Athletic Association in the 4 mile team event.

In 1905, Lightbody won AAU titles in both the 800 and 1500 metres, and the following year he competed in his second Olympics, the 1906 Intercalated Games of in Athens. He successfully defended his 1500 metres title, and placed second in the 800 metres.

Lightbody competed again in the 1908 Summer Olympics. In the 800 metres, he placed only fourth in his first round heat. Lightbody lost a close race to fellow American James Sullivan in the first round of the 1500 metres, eliminating him from further competition. He was defeated by a mere ten yards by Harry Sewell in the first round of the 3200 metre steeplechase and did not qualify for the final.

Lightbody died in 1953, two weeks short of his 71st birthday in Charleston, South Carolina.

References

Sources
 
 
 
 

1882 births
1953 deaths
American male middle-distance runners
American male steeplechase runners
Athletes (track and field) at the 1904 Summer Olympics
Athletes (track and field) at the 1906 Intercalated Games
Athletes (track and field) at the 1908 Summer Olympics
Olympic gold medalists for the United States in track and field
Olympic silver medalists for the United States in track and field
Medalists at the 1904 Summer Olympics
Medalists at the 1906 Intercalated Games